Jack Sprague (born August 8, 1964) is an American former stock car racing driver who has competed in all of NASCAR's three top divisions, most notably in the Craftsman Truck Series, where he won series championships in 1997, 1999 and 2001.

Racing career

Beginnings
Sprague was born in Spring Lake, Michigan, and began racing street stock cars at local short tracks. After winning the track championships at Thunderbird Raceway and later Winston Raceway, Sprague began racing in the NASCAR Winston Racing Series, in its North Carolina Late Model Division competition. He won the Big Ten Championship at Concord Motorsports Park, and won more than 30 Late Model Races. Eventually, he won the NASCAR Winston Racing Series championship at Concord Motorsports Park.

Sprague finished first in the inaugural race of the NASCAR Sportsman Division at Charlotte Motor Speedway in 1989, but was disqualified in post-race inspection, giving the win to Tim Bender.

Busch Series
Sprague made his Busch Series debut in 1989 at Charlotte Motor Speedway. Driving the No. 78 Griffin Racing Chevrolet, he qualified 28th but finished 41st after suffering engine failure early in the race. After a 40th-place finish at the Goody's 300 for Pucci & Associates, Sprague moved up to drive the No. 34 Keystone Beer-sponsored car for Frank Cicci Racing in 1990. He competed in nineteen races and had a best finish of sixth at Orange County Speedway. The following season, Sprague competed in seven races, driving the No. 48 Staff America-sponsored Oldsmobile. He won his first career pole at Charlotte. He continued to drive the car in 1992, where he had a second-place finish at New River Valley Speedway. He finished 24th in the final standings.

In 1993, Sprague signed to drive the No. 74 BACE Motorsports car. Despite four top-ten finishes, he was released with just a handful of races left in the year. He finished nineteenth in points. Sprague returned to the Winston Cup Series in 1994.

Craftsman Truck Series
Sprague began racing in the Trucks' first year of competition in 1995. He began the season in the No. 31 Chevrolet Silverado for Griffin Racing, winning the pole at Louisville Speedway. After the Action Packed Racing Cards 150, Sprague switched to the No. 25 Budweiser-sponsored Chevy for Hendrick Motorsports for the rest of the year. He ended the season with a pole at Phoenix International Raceway, and had three fourth-place finishes. In 1996, he slid over to the No. 24 Quaker State-sponsored truck owned by Hendrick, winning his first race at Phoenix, followed up by back-to-back victories at Nazareth Speedway and The Milwaukee Mile. With five wins total and two poles, Sprague lost the championship by 53 points. That season, he made his Winston Cup debut, running a pair of races in the No. 52 Pedigree Petfoods-sponsored Pontiac Grand Prix for Ken Schrader. He led two laps and finished 23rd in his debut at Phoenix, but wrecked the following week at Atlanta Motor Speedway.

The following season, Sprague won at Phoenix, Nazareth, and Nashville Speedway USA, and won the championship. In addition, he returned to the Cup series, subbing for Ricky Craven at Bristol Motor Speedway, but finished 40th after a wreck. Despite winning the Truck Series championship, Quaker State did not return as Sprague's primary sponsor, forcing him to start the 1998 unsponsored. After a one-race deal with Big Daddy's BBQ Sauce at Portland Speedway, Sprague won The No Fear Challenge in his debut for sponsor GMAC, allowing them to join full-time as sponsor. He won five races total that season and finished second in points. He returned to the Busch Series to drive the No. 40 Channellock-sponsored Chevy for Doug Taylor at Watkins Glen International, finishing sixth.

In 1999, Sprague won three races as well as the Craftsman Truck Series championship by eight points. He also drove at Watkins Glen in a Terry Labonte-owned car, finishing twelfth, and attempted the Exide NASCAR Select Batteries 400 for Tyler Jet Motorsports, but failed to qualify. He won three more times in 2000, but crashes caused him to drop to fifth in the standings. In 2001, NetZero became his primary sponsor, and he won seven poles and four races, and took home his third championship trophy.

Return to Busch and Cup
After 2001, Sprague and teammate Ricky Hendrick moved back to the Busch Series, with Sprague driving the No. 24 NetZero Chevy. He won his first career Busch race at Nashville Superspeedway as well as leading the points during the season, before finishing fifth in the final standings. That same year, he ran the IROC series, finishing in the top-ten in all four events. He returned to Winston Cup to run a handful of races for Haas CNC Racing's No. 60 entry. His best finish was a 30th at Homestead-Miami Speedway. Haas switched to Pontiac and the No. 0 with a NetZero sponsorship for 2003, signing Sprague to compete for Winston Cup Rookie of the Year honors. Sprague's best finish that season was a fourteenth at the Daytona 500. After the Tropicana 400, Sprague was fired from the ride. He drove in two Truck races that year for Xpress Motorsports, finishing fifth in both events.

2004–2011

Sprague took over the 16 Xpress truck full-time in 2004, winning six poles and the UAW/GM Ohio 250. He finished seventh in points. The following season, he won at Texas Motor Speedway, but late in the season, was released in favor of Mike Bliss and took over at newly formed Wyler Racing for Chad Chaffin. Despite switching teams mid-season, he finished eighth in points.

Sprague finished the 2006 season fifth in points with two wins and two poles. He returned to the Con-Way Freight Tundra for the 2007 season. Sprague started the 2007 season in the Craftsman Truck Series with a win in the Chevy Silverado HD 250 at the Daytona International Speedway. However, Sprague began to struggle throughout the year, even dropping out of the top 10 in points. This, combined with Con-way's departure at the end of the season, led Sprague to leave Wyler for Kevin Harvick Incorporated where he drove the No. 2 American Commercial Lines Chevrolet. Late in the year, he left KHI to return to Wyler Racing.

Sprague remained on the sidelines throughout 2009 and 2010, into at least October 2011.

Sprague was rumored to return to the Trucks with Winfield Motorsports at Homestead. It was also rumored that Sprague had struck a deal with Randy Moss Motorsports to return to the series in 2012, though both deals apparently did not materialize as RMM's equipment was purchased by crew chief Richie Wauters to form his own team, Wauters Motorsports.

Motorsports career results

NASCAR
(key) (Bold – Pole position awarded by qualifying time. Italics – Pole position earned by points standings or practice time. * – Most laps led.)

Winston Cup Series

Daytona 500

Busch Series

Camping World Truck Series

ARCA Bondo/Mar-Hyde Series
(key) (Bold – Pole position awarded by qualifying time. Italics – Pole position earned by points standings or practice time. * – Most laps led.)

International Race of Champions
(key) (Bold – Pole position. * – Most laps led.)

References

External links

 
 

Living people
1964 births
People from Spring Lake, Michigan
Racing drivers from Michigan
NASCAR drivers
NASCAR Truck Series champions
International Race of Champions drivers
Hendrick Motorsports drivers
Stewart-Haas Racing drivers